The following highways are numbered 435:

Canada
Manitoba Provincial Road 435
New Brunswick Route 435
Newfoundland and Labrador Route 435

Japan
 Route 435 (Japan)

United Kingdom
A435 running between Birmingham and Cirencester

United States
  Interstate 435
  Florida State Road 435
  Indiana State Road 435 (former)
  Louisiana Highway 435
  Ohio State Route 435
  Pennsylvania Route 435
  Wyoming Highway 435

Territories
  Puerto Rico Highway 435